Map (Timap), or Amo (Among), is a divergent Kainji language of Nigeria.

References

East Kainji languages
Languages of Nigeria